Sangharsha is a 1993 Indian Kannada-language action thriller film written and directed by Sunil Kumar Desai, and produced by Krishna Raju. The film stars Vishnuvardhan, Shivaranjini and Geetha. The film's music is scored by Guna Singh whilst the cinematography is by P. Rajan. The film was dubbed in Tamil as Veera Muzhakkam.

Cast 

 Vishnuvardhan as Mahesh 
 Geetha as Poornima 
 Shivaranjini
 Sundar Krishna Urs 
 Thiagarajan
 R. N. Sudarshan
 Ramesh Bhat
 NGEF Ramamurthy 
 B. C. Patil
 Avinash
 Rockline Venkatesh
 Mahesh Kumar
 Praveen
 Janakiram
 G. K. Govinda Rao

Soundtrack 
The music of the film was composed by Guna Singh. The audio was released on Lahari Music label.

References

External links 
 

1993 films
1990s Kannada-language films
1993 action thriller films
Indian crime drama films
Indian action thriller films
Films directed by Sunil Kumar Desai
1993 crime drama films